There Is a Happy Land is a hymn by Andrew Young (1807–1889), a Scottish schoolmaster, and first published in 1838. It now may be sung to a tune arranged by Leonard P. Breedlove.

Young's grave is on the western wall of Rosebank Cemetery in Edinburgh and refers to his authorship of the hymn.

Cultural references
The song is known for being quoted or adapted in various contexts:

 The parody "There Is a Boarding-House" by Mark Twain appears in his novel The American Claimant (1892)
 It is a favorite song of Krazy Kat, the main character from George Herriman's eponymous newspaper comic strip (1913-1944), where the song's opening verse is often willingly misspelled as "There is a heppy lend fur fur away... [sic]".
 In the book Little House on the Prairie by Laura Ingalls Wilder, Ma sings "There is a happy land, Far far away, Where saints in glory stand, Bright, bright as day. Oh, to hear the angels sing, Glory to the Lord, our King" while waiting during the night Pa was on his way back home from the town of Independence, Kansas.  
 In Wilder's later book By the Shores of Silver Lake Laura recounts railroad men singing the "shocking" lyrics of what is evidently Mark Twain's "There is a Boarding-House" parody, and notes that they stopped when they saw Ma.
 It is sung in the film Arsenic and Old Lace (1944) 
 It is sung in the film The King and I (1956)
 The J.Geils Band song "Centerfold" features a very similar tune being played on a keyboard 
 The melody is borrowed in the rock song "Run Runaway" (1983) by Slade
 It appears in the film  The Proposition (2005);

References

Scottish Christian hymns
1838 songs
19th-century hymns